The Baptist Convention of Eastern Cuba is a Baptist Christian denomination in Cuba. It is affiliated with the Baptist World Alliance. The headquarters is in Santiago de Cuba.

History
The Baptist Convention of Eastern Cuba has its origins in a mission of the American Baptist International Ministries in Santiago de Cuba in 1899.  It is officially founded in 1905.  According to a denomination census released in 2020, it claimed 672 churches and 43,506 members.

See also
 Bible
 Born again
 Baptist beliefs
 Worship service (evangelicalism)
 Jesus Christ
 Believers' Church

References

External links
 Official Website

Baptist denominations in the Caribbean
Baptist Christianity in Cuba